was a Japanese daimyō of the late Edo period, who ruled the Nagaoka Domain. Born the son of Matsudaira Munehide, he was adopted as heir by Makino Tadayuki.

Daimyo
Meiji Restoration
1844 births
1875 deaths
Makino clan
People from Nagaoka Domain